Harshal Pushkarna was an executive editor and writer in Safari magazine. He is the son of Nagendra Vijay and grandson of Vijaygupta Maurya. He owns and publishes Gujarati travel magazine GYPSY TRAVELLER, and writes for Gujarat Samachar Daily.

Life 
Harshal Pushkarna was born in a family of nationalist journalists-writers. His father Nagendra Vijay is a senior journalist while grandfather Vijaygupta Maurya was a pioneer science writer and an ornithologist. He was surrounded by books and stories of revolutionaries, patriots and scientists from childhood.  Reading such books inspired him to choose the field of meaningful journalism, and he started his journey with Safari magazine in his teenage years which was at that time owned by his father.

Career 

Safari magazine was his dream project that would nurture and nourish children of Gujarat with knowledge and nationalism. He joined ‘Safari’ in 1989 at the age of 14 years as it was run by his father, and worked as an office assistant for some years. He was gradually upgraded to higher posts on basis of working skills in his father's owned magazine. Meanwhile, he completed his schooling from Sharda Mandir Vinay Mandir School, Ahmedabad in 1992 and Bachelor of Commerce education from Shree Sahajanand Art & Commerce College, Ahmedabad in year 1995. But he had already found his true calling by then. It was to continue the family tradition of nationalist and meaningful journalism, keeping pace with changing times . There is no looking back since then. As a science writer he started his career with his own magazine. He also contributed his science articles for dailies like Sandesh and Mid-Day; and weekly magazines like Network in 1995–97. In 1998, he edited Citylife News — a city magazine of Ahmedabad. In the year 2000, he penned, edited and published an 88-page volume titled '20 mi sadi ni 50 ajod satyaghatnao' (Fifty historical events of the 20th Century).

He has worked as an honorary scientific adviser to Science City, Gandhinagar.

He has written in-depth articles on various subjects like astronomy, defence, Information Technology, animal world, history, geography, military technology in his monthly Safari magazine.

Besides writing and editing Safari magazine, he has edited, designed and published several books and magazines written by his father Nagendra Vijay and grandfather Vijaygupta Maurya.

Works 
Harshal Pushkarna has authored a book titled 'AA CHHE SIACHEN'(meaning 'THIS IS SIACHEN') in Gujarati language. This book attempts to analyse Siachen Glacier—the world's highest battlefield—strategically. Moreover, it is a travelogue-cum-true story in which the heroes are the lionhearted soldiers of the Indian Army. They are the living examples of adventure, sincerity, bravery, loyalty, devotion to duty and patriotism. English edition of this book has been titled 'THIS IS SIACHEN'. The same book has Marathi edition too which is titled 'HE AAHE SIACHEN' (Marathi: हे आहे सिआचेन). The Marathi book was launched in the city of Nashik at Kusumagraj Prthistan (कुसुमाग्रज प्रतिष्ठान) on 22 October 2017.Harshal Pushkarna has taken up a non-commercial initiative called Siachen Awareness Drive (Gujarati : સિઆચેન જનજાગૃતિ ઝુંબેશ) to educate the people of India about the extreme weather conditions in Siachen Glacier and the role of the brave soldiers of Indian Army in Siachen. The basic idea of Siachen Awareness Drive is twofold: (1) to ignite the spirit of patriotism in the people of India; (2) to encourage the youth to join the army and serve the nation. Moreover, Harshal Pushkarna encourages the audience to write letters, greeting cards etc. to the soldiers of the Indian Armed Forces.

Siachen Awareness Drive programs are absolutely free for all, and have successfully been done in cities like Ahmedabad, Surat, Rajkot, Vadodara, Bharuch, Bhuj, Anjar, Jamnagar, Kandivali (West) and Ghatkopar (West), Mumbai, Porbandar, Kalol, Anand, Killa Pardi (Valsad), Navsari, Junagadh, Morbi, Valsad, Nagpur (Maharashtra) etc. so far.

On April 22, 2018, Harshal Pushkarna launched yet another book—titled "PARAM VIR CHAKRA"—dedicated to the brave soldiers of the Indian Armed Forces. The book narrates, in depth, the lives and times of 21 lionhearted soldiers who were decorated with Param Vir Chakra the highest military decoration. The book was launched by Capt. Bana Singh (PVC). 

From October, 2018 he started a Gujarati Travel magazine named Gypsy Traveller. This monthly magazine is for targeted Gujarati people who love to travel and explore new places. 

On an auspicious occasion of Dashera, on October 25, 2020, Harshal Pushkarna launched yet another book—titled "Shaurya"—"શૌર્યઃ ભારત માતાના સપૂતોના સાહસ-સમર્પણની અમરકથા" dedicated to the operations carried out by Indian Commandos. The book narrates, in depth, the lives and operations of Commandos of Indian armed forces. 

From April, 2020 he regularly writes featured articles for a prominent Gujarati newspaper Gujarat Samachar.

He also runs trekking organization Gypsy Outdoors.

References

Year of birth missing (living people)
Indian editors
Indian publishers (people)
Gujarati-language writers
Living people